Henri van Osch (12 April 1945 – 22 June 2001) was a Dutch swimmer. He competed at the 1964 Summer Olympics in the 200 m backststroke event but failed to reach the final. He was married to Henriette D'Engelbronner.

References

1945 births
2001 deaths
Dutch male backstroke swimmers
Olympic swimmers of the Netherlands
Swimmers at the 1964 Summer Olympics
Sportspeople from Groningen (city)
20th-century Dutch people